The Zambia National Broadcasting Corporation (ZNBC) is a Zambian television and radio station, formerly state owned, now technically a statutory body but still essentially under government control. It is the oldest, widest, and largest radio and television service provider in Zambia It was established by an Act of Parliament in 1987, which was passed to transform the Zambia Broadcasting Services from being a Government Department under the Ministry of Information and Broadcasting Services into a statutory body called the Zambia National Broadcasting Corporation.

History

Introduction of radio
It was not until World War II that Zambia, then Northern Rhodesia, acquired a radio service. In 1941 the Government's Information Department installed a 300 watt transmitter in Lusaka, the capital. Known as Radio Lusaka, this station was built for the purpose of disseminating war-related information. From the outset, the Lusaka station addressed programs to Africans in their own languages, becoming the pioneer in the field of local vernacular broadcasting in Africa. In 1945, Harry Franklin, Director of the Information Department,  proposed that Radio Lusaka be developed into a fully-fledged station broadcasting exclusively to Africans. Since Northern Rhodesia could not afford such a specialized service on its own, the administrations of Southern Rhodesia and Nyasaland were persuaded to share in the operating costs, while the British Government agreed to provide capital funds. Thus, the Central African Broadcasting Station (CABS) came into being.

Among the by-products of this effort were the world's most extensive collection of ethnic African music, and a breakthrough in that most formidable barrier to audience growth, the lack of a receiver which Africans could afford to buy. Franklin tried for three years in the late 1940s to persuade British manufacturers that a potential mass market existed among Africans for a very simple inexpensive battery operated short wave receiver, in the era before transistors, before finally persuading a battery company to invest in the research and development of the idea. One of the early models was mounted experimentally in a 9-inch diameter aluminum housing originally intended as a saucepan. Thus was born in 1949 the famous "Saucepan Special", a 4-tube tropicalized short wave receiver. This succeeded even beyond Franklin's expectations. It cost five pounds Sterling, and the battery, which lasted 300 hours, an additional one-pound five shillings. Within the first three months 1,500 of the Saucepan Specials had been sold, and in the next few years, 50,000 sets were imported. Franklin had hopes of capitalising on a world market for the sets, but within a few years the transistor radio came into mass production and so turned his brainchild into a mere historical curiosity.

Federation
In 1953, the Federation of Rhodesia and Nyasaland was established, with Salisbury, Southern Rhodesia (now Harare, Zimbabwe) as its capital, and the Southern Rhodesian Broadcasting Service, which catered for European listeners, became the Federal Broadcasting Service (FBS). The CABS, still based in Lusaka, continued to use African languages as well as English.

In 1955, a Federal Commission of Enquiry into the organisation of broadcasting in the Federation proposed the creation of a new broadcasting organisation, to be called the "Rhodesia and Nyasaland Broadcasting Corporation", which was to be established in 1956. However, it was not until 1958 that the FBS and CABS would be merged into  the Federal Broadcasting Corporation (FBC).

Introduction of television
In 1961, a television service, which had been introduced in the Salisbury and Bulawayo areas, became available in the Copper Belt of Northern Rhodesia. Operated by Rhodesia Television (RTV), the service's headquarters later moved to Lusaka.

Independence
However, disagreements between the three constituent territories of the Federation led to its break-up in 1964, after which Northern Rhodesia and Nyasaland would gain independence as Zambia and Malawi. The former FBC station in Lusaka became the Northern Rhodesia Broadcasting Corporation, which following independence later that year, was renamed the Zambia Broadcasting Corporation (ZBC). This, in turn, was succeeded by the Zambia Broadcasting Service (ZBS) in 1966. In the same year, the government also took control of television services, with Television Zambia becoming part of the ZBS in 1967. At the end of 1988, the ZBS was replaced by the Zambia National Broadcasting Corporation (ZNBC), a government department under the Ministry of Information, Broadcasting and Tourism.

Broadcasting services

There are three domestic services. Radio 1 is carried over 8 FM transmitters, broadcasting in the seven major languages of Bemba, Nyanja, Lozi, Tonga, Kaonde, Lunda and Luvale. These are used in rotation to ensure a prime time audience for each group. Radio 2 is also broadcast by 8 FM transmitters in English, while Radio 4 is broadcast in English over 5 FM transmitters. The now defunct Radio 3 was the international service. Used mainly by liberation movements in other countries in the region, it closed in 1992, having been considered to have outlived its usefulness.

Programs include news, public affairs, light entertainment, sport, religion and education. School broadcasts are carried during school semesters. Agricultural programs for farmers cover all the country areas. Listening is encouraged by free provision of receivers for farm radio forums, of which there are more than 600. An annual licence fee is payable but many receivers are not licensed.

The principal activity of the corporation is to provide Information, Entertainment and Education to the people of Zambia.

Journalists 
Some of the journalists who have worked for ZNBC include: 
 ZNBC Lusaka Studios

Hector Simfukwe
 Brian Mwale
Masautso Mukwayaya
Lucky Phiri
Fortune Malata
Patricia Banda
Joshua Jere 
Henry Ngilazi 
Dora Siliya
Masuzyo Ndhlovu
Claudet Sindaza
 ZNBC Kitwe Studios
 Paul Monde Shalala
 Queen Chungu Malama
 Ravizaria Musakanya
 Mushota Mpundu
Lupindula Mwewa
Obinato Saili
Chansa Mayani
Victor Sakala

Television programming

Former

International

Children's
100 Deeds for Eddie McDowd
Betty's Bunch
The Boy from Andromeda
The Boy Who Won the Pools
Bozo the Clown
Byker Grove
The Huggabug Club
H.R. Pufnstuf
Kaboodle
The Kids of Degrassi Street
Lamb Chop's Play-Along
Pinky and Perky
Press Gang
Richard the Lionheart
Sesame Street
Stingray
Thunderbirds
Woof!

Animation
ALF: The Animated Series
Amigo and Friends
Atom Ant
Bob Morane
Bozo: The World's Most Famous Clown
CBS Storybreak
Code Lyoko
Corduroy
Count Duckula
C.L.Y.D.E.
Denver, the Last Dinosaur
DuckTales
Eckhart
Fat Albert and the Cosby Kids
The Flintstones
Flipper and Lopaka
Franklin
The Fruitties
Ghostbusters
Groovie Goolies 
Heathcliff
He-Man and the Masters of the Universe
Highlander: The Animated Series
Iron Man
Jonny Quest
Josie and the Pussycats
Kid Power
Kit and Kaboodle
Laurel and Hardy
The Littles
Madeline
The Mysterious Cities of Gold
My Favorite Martians
The New Three Stooges
Nilus the Sandman
The Raccoons
The Road Runner Show
Roger Ramjet
Rude Dog and the Dweebs
She-Ra: Princess of Power
Space Ghost and Dino Boy
Spider-Man and His Amazing Friends
Sport Billy
Supa Strikas
Team Galaxy
Top Cat
Voltron
Zazoo U

Anthology
Hammer House of Horror
The Wonderful World of Disney

Drama
The Adventures of William Tell
Airwolf
The A-Team
Burke's Law
Danger Man
Doctor Who
Egoli: Place of Gold
ER
The Fugitive
The Long Way Home
MacGyver
Run for Your Life

Documentary
All Our Yesterdays
Man Alive

Current Affairs
World in Action

Christian
The World Tomorrow

Comedy
ALF
Amen
Dad's Army
Diff'rent Strokes
Family Matters
The Fresh Prince of Bel-Air
The Good Guys
The Goodies
In Living Color
Keeping Up Appearances
The Muppet Show
No Place Like Home
Parenthood
The Patty Duke Show
Sidekicks

Soap Opera
Generations
Isidingo
Take the High Road
Passions
No One But You
My 3 Sisters
Sad Love Story

References

External links
 Zambia National Broadcasting Corporation
 Zambian Broadcasting

Television stations in Zambia
Mass media companies established in 1964
Television channels and stations established in 1966
1964 establishments in Zambia
1966 establishments in Zambia